Laurent Angliviel de la Beaumelle (28 January 1726 in Valleraugue – 17 November 1773 in Gard) was a French Protestant writer.

Life
La Beaumelle was a brilliant student in Alès and stayed there for eight years (1734–42). He joined the Reformed Church in 1744. In 1745 he went to Geneva; the next year he joined the Freemasons. In 1747 he went to Denmark and wrote Traité sur la tolérance, and L'Asiatique tolérant, ou traité à l'usage de Zeokinizul, roi des Kofirans, surnommé le Chéri published in Amsterdam in 1749. Then he was appointed as professor of French literature at the University of Copenhagen. In 1751 he received almost simultaneously with Voltaire, an invitation by the Prussian King Frederick the Great to come to Sanssouci in Potsdam. Beaumelle fell out with "La Voltaire" and he went back to Paris, visiting Gotha and Frankfurt, in 1752 with deadly hatred of Voltaire.

Because of his "Notes sur le siècle de Louis XIV", La Beaumelle was arrested on 24 April and imprisoned in the Bastille till 12 October 1753. In 1755 he went to Holland and met with Henri de Catt. Soon after his return to Paris, the publication of his Mémoires de la Maintenon brought him again for a year in jail (September 1757). Voltaire seems both times to have been involved. After his release, La Beaumelle settled down as a freelance writer in Toulouse (1759), but without permission to leave the Languedoc. La Beaumelle got involved in the case of Jean Calas. In 1764 he married Rose-Victoire Lavaysse. Their daughter Aglaé was born in 1768. Around 1770 King Louis XV appointed him at the Bibliothèque Royale, and granted him a pension.

Reception
Most of his writings bear a polemical, pamphlet-like character or speculate (as contained in the "Memoirs of Madame de Maintenon") on the audience's curiosity. His best writing is unquestionably "Reponse au Supplément du siècle de Louis XIV, ou Lettres à Voltaire" (1754, 1763), by wit, spirit and energy the most distinguished. His worst is the "Commentaire sur la Henriade" (1775), a very model of inept, pathetic criticism.

Works
 Traité sur la tolérance
 L'Asiatique tolérant, ou traité à l'usage de Zeokinizul, roi des Kofirans, surnommé le Chéri
 Mes pensées. Copenhagen 1751 (Glogau 1754)
 Notes sur le siècle de Louis XIV (an annotated version of Voltaire's Le Siècle de Louis XIV
 Mémoires de la Maintenon. Amsterdam 1755/56 (9 vols.)
 Commentaire sur la Henriade
 Reponse au Supplément du siècle de Louis XIV, ou Lettres à Voltaire

Literature
 Michel Nicolas: Sur la vie et les écrits de Laurent Angliviel de La Beaumelle. Cherbuliez, Paris 1852.
 La Beaumelle, Laurent Angliviel de: Correspondence générale de La Beaumelle  / éd. par Hubert Bost ... . - Oxford : Voltaire Foundation, 2005–2012. 
 Claude Lauriol, Études sur La Beaumelle (Paris: Editions Honoré Champion, 2008) (Vie des Huguenots, 42).

External links

 
 

1773 deaths
1726 births
18th-century French writers
18th-century French male writers
French Freemasons
Huguenots
Angliviel de la Beaumelle family
French expatriates in Denmark
Prisoners of the Bastille